Saurabbh Roy (born 2 December 1982) is an Indian television and film actor who acts mainly in Bollywood. He is the finalist of Grasim Mr. India 2006 And winner of the sub title "Best Dressed Male" recently seen in Box Cricket League – Punjab (BCL Punjab) playing for Team "Royal Patialvi".  Saurabbh is recognized as the Fear Factor: Khatron Ke Khiladi (season 4) contestant. Where he was partnered with Smita Bansal He  played Draupadi`s father, Draupad, in the  show Mahabharat (2013 TV series) also seen in a TV show Amita ka Amit.

Filmography

References

External links

1988 births
Living people
Male actors in Hindi television
Male actors from Allahabad